Klingenbach is a town in the Eisenstadt-Umgebung district in the Austrian state of Burgenland. It is located near the border with Hungary with a border crossing into Sopron.

Population

Personalities
Writer Simon Knéfacz and writer Stefan Geosits lived and worked here.

References

Cities and towns in Eisenstadt-Umgebung District
Austria–Hungary border crossings